Florian Magnus Maier (born 1973), also known as Morean, is a German classical composer, guitarist, producer and vocalist of the bands Alkaloid, Dark Fortress, and Noneuclid. Although born in Munich, he has resided in the Netherlands for over 20 years, his primary occupation being a composer and guitar player within both the contemporary classical and heavy metal communities. Although mostly recognized within the metal community for his vocalist duties with black metal band Dark Fortress, Maier is also a vocalist and guitarist for progressive metal outfits Alkaloid and Noneuclid. Being a classical composer, Maier has also collaborated with Devin Townsend and Paradise Lost on orchestrations.

In 2014, the Dutch Public Broadcasting channel released a documentary about the life and work of Maier, highlighting his most famous classical piece, Schattenspiel.

After the departure of Erick Rutan from Morbid Angel, Maier auditioned for the lead guitarist role, and was one of the 3 runners-up to take the position, eventually delegated to Destructhor of Zyklon.

Personal life

Maier was born in Munich, and cultivated an interest in extreme metal music since he was 13. His first band was a thrash metal group called Messenger, where he handled guitar and vocal duties. Having played for several years with his own thrash metal bands in his parents basement, at 17 he became obsessed with flamenco guitar styles and at 21 this prompted him to move to the Netherlands to study flamenco guitar with Paco Peña, and eventually classical composition with Klaas de Vries at the conservatory of Rotterdam. He credits Klaas de Vries, with his development in music. He earned his BA cum laude in composition in 2001, and has mainly worked as a composer and guitarist with orchestras and metal musicians.

Maier played flamenco guitar for 12 years, however, he was diagnosed with hypermobility in all of his joints, preventing him from using his thumb and consequentially, dropping flamenco altogether. Currently, he uses 7 and 8 string B.C Rich and Ibanez guitars within both his own ensemble orchestrations and heavy metal bands.

Maier is known within the metal community as Morean. He is married to Sanja Maier-Hasagic.

Music

Dark Fortress

Maier joined the German Black Metal band Dark Fortress in 2007, and has since released 4 full records with the band. Despite his primary occupation as a composer and guitarist, he handled vocal and lyrical duties exclusively for all their records hitherto, while occasionally playing guitars as well. In particular, Maier has been influential in utilizing lyrics and imagery based on philosophical and sometimes occultist viewpoints.

When speaking about the black metal scene and adoption of corsepaint for atmospheric purposes, Maier states:

As for the image: we like to think of ourselves as sophisticated and thinking individuals that live their beliefs in everything, not just on stage, and we would feel like a bunch of morons if we lowered ourselves to the level of idiocy of the usual black metal clichés. Contrary to other bands, we actually try to say something, even though we know some people only get happy if you mention Satan or bathe in your own (or someone else's) vomit. We are not schizophrenic in that sense; we don't pretend to be some random, under-researched lord of hell with a clown face on stage and go back to being a complaining, miserable cog in the machine who hates his life after the show.

Alkaloid

Progressive metal supergroup Alkaloid was formed in 2014, initially set up as a collaboration between Hannes Grossmann, Christian Münzner, Danny Tunker and Linus Klausenitzer. Grossmann invited Maier to join on guitar and vocalist duties. Maier said "it was just impossible to say no (and not join the band)". The band stated that their first record, 'The Malkuth Grimoire', did not receive support from any labels because it was too diverse and hence unmarketable. Consequently, they crowdfunded the album, receiving more than $21,000 dollars in donations from fans across the world.

Grossmann stated that a central reason for his departure from death metal band Obscura was to collaborate with Maier. Concerning Maier's ability, Grossmann said "he is the best composer I have ever worked with". Speaking of Maier's abilities, guitarist Christian Münzner said that "The guy is probably the most amazing guitar player I ever met."

Documentary

In 2014, the Netherlands Public Broadcasting network NPO released a 50-minute documentary about Maier's life and his composition of a double-guitar concerto, featuring Izhar Elias, entitled "Schattenspiel" ("Shadowplay") for the Zaterdagmatinee, whose performance took place at the Royal Concertgebouw in Amsterdam. In this documentary, Maier speaks about his childhood, heavy metal during his formative years, familial support and transition to flamenco and classical style guitar playing and composition.

Hypermobility

Maier played flamenco guitar with Paco Peña until 2006, at which he was diagnosed with hypermobility, and reverted to electric and acoustic guitars. He is unable to use his thumb for traditional flamenco picking, so incorporates flamenco influences in his electric guitar based music.

Discography

Classical

Florian Magnus Maier - Afterglow (2000) - Composer
Florian Magnus Maier - Transcarnation (2001) - Composer
Florian Magnus Maier - Plutonic (2003) - Composer
Florian Magnus Maier - Luciferase (2006) - Composer

Metal
Noneuclid - The Crawling Chaos (2006) - Guitars
Dark Fortress - Eidolon (2008) - Vocals
Dark Fortress - Ylem (2010) - Vocals
Devin Townsend Project - Deconstruction (2011) - Orchestration
Obscura - Omnivium (2011) - Guest solo on 'Velocity'
Devin Townsend Project - Z² (2014) - Orchestration
Hannes Grossmann - The Radial Covenant (2014) - Vocals
Noneuclid - Metatheosis (2014) - Vocals & Guitars
Dark Fortress  - Venereal Dawn (2014) - Vocals & acoustic guitars
Alkaloid - The Malkuth Grimoire (2015) - Vocals & Guitars
Hannes Grossmann II - The Crypts of Sleep (2016) - Vocals
Alkaloid - Liquid Anatomy (2018) - Vocals & Guitars
Hannes Grossmann - Apophenia (2019)
Dark Fortress - Spectres from the Old World (2020) - Vocals

Awards

 Paul Jacobs Memorial Award (2001, 2002) 
 Matthijs Vermeulen Prize (2002) 
 Composition Prize of the Codarts Rotterdam Conservatory (2001)

References

1973 births
Living people
German male classical composers
German male guitarists
21st-century German male singers
Musicians from Munich
21st-century German guitarists